Ryker is a given name with different origins. It may be a transferred use of a surname of German origin. or a surname derived from a Dutch diminutive of Richard.

It is currently a well-used name for boys in the United States. Usage of the name might have increased due to association with the Star Trek: The Next Generation character William Riker.  It is a name that is notably more commonly used by whites in rural states of the United States compared with those in more urban areas.

Notes